Hermann von Wissmann may refer to:

 Hermann Wissmann (1853–1905), German explorer and administrator in Africa
 Hermann von Wissmann (steamship), a German steamer
 Hermann von Wissmann (ship, 1940), became in 1950 the Belgian Kamina
 Hermann von Wissmann (geographer) (1895–1979), German-Austrian explorer of Arabia, son of the above